Zvonce or Zvonačka Banja is a village and spa located in the municipality of Babušnica, eastern Serbia. As of 2011 census, it has a population of 191 inhabitants.

See also
 List of spa towns in Serbia

References

Populated places in Pirot District
Bulgarian communities in Serbia